Harrison Grover Fagg (born October 27, 1931) is an American architect and politician in Montana, U.S.. Fagg is a former Republican member of Montana House of Representatives from 1968 to 1984. He was the majority leader in 1981. An architect, he attended Montana State University and the University of Oregon.

Personal life 
In 1952, Fagg married Darlene Bohling (1931-2012).

References

External links 
 Harrison Fagg at ballotpedia.org
 ‘Endlessly superlative’ Absaroka-Beartooth Wilderness marks 40th anniversary this week (March 26, 2018)

1931 births
Living people
Republican Party members of the Montana House of Representatives
Architects from Montana
Politicians from Billings, Montana
University of Oregon alumni
Montana State University alumni